Jorge Oteiza  (October 21, 1908 – April 9, 2003), was a Basque Spanish sculptor, painter, designer and writer from the Basque Autonomous Community, renowned for being one of the main theorists on Basque modern art.
Oteiza was born in Orio (Gipuzkoa, Basque Autonomous Community, Spain). He moved to South America in 1935, just before the Spanish Civil War, and stayed there for 14 years. In 1963 he published Quosque tandem!, an essay about the aesthetics inherent to Basque soul, based on Basque prehistoric art and Basque people's anthropological roots. Three years on, he contributed to found the artistic group Gaur.

He died in San Sebastián, Gipuzkoa, in 2003. Following his will, a month after his death a museum dedicated to his career was opened in Alzuza, Navarre, in the place where he had lived since 1975. The Oteiza Museum is a monographic exhibition space housing the personal collection of Jorge Oteiza, which includes 1,690 sculptures, 2,000 experimental pieces from the artist's Chalk Laboratory, and an extensive collection of drawings and collages.

Main prizes and awards 
Jorge Oteiza was granted several prizes and awards throughout his life:
 
 1953 — Only Spanish sculptor selected for the international competition for the Monument to the Unknown Political Prisoner. The project is exhibited in the Tate Gallery (London).
 1954 — Spanish National Award of Architecture, for a project to do a chapel on the Road to Santiago. It was a joint project, together with architects F. J. Sáenz de Oiza and Luis Romaní, and it was not carried out.
 1957 — Grand Prix for his sculpture at the IV São Paulo Art Biennial (Brazil).
 1970 — First Prize in the competition for the urban planning of the Plaza de Colón in Madrid. It was a joint project, together with Angel Orbe, Mario Gaviria and Luis Arana, and it was not carried out.
 1985 — Gold Medal for Fine Arts, awarded by the Spanish Ministry of Culture.
 1986 — Selected for the exhibition Qu’est-ce que la sculpture moderne? 1900-1970, held in the Museum of Modern Art at the Georges Pompidou Center in Paris.
 1988 — Prince of Asturias Prize for the Arts.
 1991 — Gold Medal of Navarre, awarded by the Government of Navarre.
 1995 — Manuel Lekuona prize by Eusko Ikaskuntza (Society of Basque Studies).
 1996 — Pevsner Prize (Paris), in recognition of his life's work.
 1996 — Honorary member of the Vascon-Navarrese Architect's Association.
 1998 — Doctor honoris causa by the University of the Basque Country.
 1998 — Madrid Fine Arts Circle Medal.
 1998 — Gipuzkoa Gold medal.

References

External links

 Oteiza Museum in Alzuza, Navarre
 Biography
 Oteiza's Selected Writings at the Basque Database
 Two Basque Sculptors. Peter Selz on Oteiza and Chillida
 Arana Cobos, Juan (2008). Jorge Oteiza: Art as Sacrament, Avant-Garde and Magic. PhD dissertation, Center for Basque Studies. University of Nevada, Reno.

1908 births
2003 deaths
People from Urola Kosta
Basque sculptors
Spanish male writers
20th-century sculptors